Residual income valuation (RIV; also, residual income model and residual income method, RIM) is an approach to equity valuation that formally accounts for the cost of equity capital.  Here, "residual" means in excess of any opportunity costs measured relative to the book value of shareholders' equity; residual income (RI) is then the income generated by a firm after accounting for the true cost of capital. The approach is largely analogous to the EVA/MVA based approach, with similar logic and advantages. Residual Income valuation has its origins in Edwards & Bell (1961), Peasnell (1982), and Ohlson (1995).

Concept
The underlying idea is that investors require a rate of return from their resources – i.e. equity – under the control of the firm's management, compensating them for their opportunity cost and accounting for the level of risk resulting.  This rate of return is the cost of equity, and a formal equity cost must be subtracted from net income. Consequently, to create shareholder value, management must generate returns at least as great as this cost.  Thus, although a company may report a profit on its income statement, it may actually be economically unprofitable; see Economic profit. It is thus possible that a value deemed positive using a traditional discounted cash flow (DCF) approach may be negative here.  RI-based valuation is therefore a valuable complement to more traditional techniques.

Calculation of residual income
The cost of equity is typically calculated using the CAPM, although other approaches such as APT are also used. The currency charge to be subtracted is then simply
Equity Charge = Equity Capital x Cost of Equity,
and 
Residual income = Net Income − Equity Charge.

Valuation formula
Using the residual income approach, the value of a company's stock can be calculated as the sum of its book value and the present value of its expected future residual income, discounted at the cost of equity, resulting in the general formula:

Here various adjustments to the balance sheet book value may be required; see Clean surplus accounting.

Typically, the above formula will be applied such that the company is assumed to achieve maturity, or "constant growth". (Note that the value will remain identical: the adjustment is a "telescoping" device). Here, analysts commonly employ the Perpetuity Growth Model to calculate the corresponding terminal value (although various, more formal approaches are also applied). Then, assuming long-run, "constant", growth  from year , the terminal value is 
,
and the RI valuation would then be:
.

Comparison with other valuation methods
As can be seen, the residual income valuation formula is similar to the dividend discount model (DDM) (and to other discounted cash flow (DCF) valuation models), substituting future residual earnings for dividend (or free cash) payments (and the cost of equity for the weighted average cost of capital).

However, the RI-based approach is most appropriate when a firm is not paying dividends or exhibits an unpredictable dividend pattern, and / or when it has negative free cash flow many years out, but is expected to generate positive cash flow at some point in the future. Further, value is recognized earlier under the RI approach, since a large part of the stock's intrinsic value is recognized immediately – current book value per share – and residual income valuations are thus less sensitive to terminal value.

At the same time, in addition to the accounting considerations mentioned above, the RI approach will not generally hold if there are expected changes in shares outstanding or if the firm plans to bring in "new" shareholders who derive a net benefit from their capital contributions.

Although EVA is similar to residual income, there will be technical differences between EVA and RI, specifically Stern Stewart & Co, originators of EVA, recommend a fairly large number of adjustments to NOPAT before the methodology may be applied. See .

See also
 Enterprise value
 Valuation (finance)#Net asset value method
 Clean surplus accounting
 T-model

Notes

External links and references

Primary references
Edwards, E. O. & Bell, P. W. (1961). "The Theory and Measurement of Business Income", University of California Press, Berkeley and Los Angeles, 1961. 
Magni, C.A. (2009). "Splitting up value: A critical review of residual income theories". European Journal of Operational Research, 198(1) (October), 1−22.
Ohlson, J. A. (1995). "Earnings, Book Values and Dividends in Equity Valuation", Contemporary Accounting Research, 11 (Spring), 1995.
Peasnell, K.V. (1982). " Some Formal Connections Between Economic Values and Yields and Accounting Numbers". Journal of Business Finance and Accounting, Vol.9, No.3, PP. 361–381.

Other references
Valuing A Company Using The Residual Income Method, Investopedia
Residual Income Valuation Model, ftsmodules.com
Three Residual Income Valuation Methods and Discounted Cash Flow Valuation, Pablo Fernandez, University of Navarra – IESE Business School
 Residual Income Valuation: The Problems, James A. Ohlson, Stern School of Business, New York University
A Tutorial on Residual Income Valuation and Value Added Valuation, Kenth Skogsvik, Stockholm School of Economics

Valuation (finance)
Fundamental analysis